The Franco-Moroccan War was fought between France and Morocco in 1844. The principal cause of war was the retreat of Algerian resistance leader Abd al-Qadir into Morocco following French victories over many of his tribal supporters during the French conquest of Algeria.

Background 
Abd al-Qadir had begun using northeastern Morocco as a refuge and a recruiting base as early as 1840, and French military movements against him heightened border tensions at that time. France made repeated diplomatic demands to Sultan Abd al-Rahman to stop Moroccan support for Abd al-Qadir, but political divisions within the Sultanate made this virtually impossible.

Tensions were heightened in 1843, when French forces chased a column of Abd al-Qadir supporters deep into Morocco following the Battle of the Smala. These men included tribesmen from Morocco, and French authorities interpreted their actions as a de facto declaration of war. While they did not act immediately, French military authorities threatened to march into the Sultanate if support for Abd al-Qadir was not withdrawn, and the border between Algeria and Morocco properly demarcated so that defenses against future incursions could be set up.

An attempt to dislodge these troops peacefully in late May 1844 failed when Moroccan tribal fighters fired on the French and were eventually driven back to Oujda. Rumours surrounding this incident, including reports that the shrine had been defiled and that French troops had entered Oujda and hanged the governor, fanned the flames of jihad in Morocco. On the 19th of June, violating the frontier, Marshal Bugeaud occupied Oujda.

War

The war began on August 6, 1844 when a French fleet under the command of the Prince of Joinville François d'Orléans conducted a naval Bombardment of the city of Tangier. 

The conflict peaked on August 14, 1844 at the Battle of Isly, which took place near Oujda. A large Moroccan force led by the Sultan's son Sidi Mohammed, was defeated by a smaller French royal force under the Governor-General of Algeria Thomas Robert Bugeaud.

Essaouira, Morocco's main Atlantic trade port, was attacked in the Bombardment of Mogador and briefly occupied by Joinville on August 16, 1844.

Aftermath 
The war formally ended on September 10, 1844 with the signing of the Treaty of Tangier, in which Morocco agreed to officially recognize Algeria as part of the French Empire, reduce the size of its garrison at Oujda, and establish a commission to demarcate the border. The border, which is essentially the modern border between Morocco and Algeria, was agreed in the Treaty of Lalla Maghnia.

See also
France-Morocco relations
French conquest of Algeria
Bombardment of Salé
Hispano-Moroccan War
French conquest of Morocco

References

External links
Chronology: The July Monarchy 1830 - 1848
Armed Conflict Events Database: Franco-Moroccan War 124 B.C. - 1912 A.D.

French
Conflicts in 1844
Wars involving France
Wars involving Morocco
Morocco
France–Morocco military relations
African resistance to colonialism
Resistance to the French colonial empire